Newspapers and other news media in the United States traditionally endorse candidates for party nomination for President of the United States, and later endorse one of the ultimate nominees for president. Below is a list of notable endorsements in 2020, by candidate, for each primary race.

Democrats

Nominee

Joe Biden

Withdrawn candidates

Michael Bloomberg

Pete Buttigieg

Amy Klobuchar

Bernie Sanders

Elizabeth Warren

Andrew Yang

Republicans

Nominee

Donald Trump

Withdrawn candidate

Bill Weld

See also

References

2020 United States presidential election endorsements
Newspaper endorsements
2020 in mass media